Tampere Cup is an annual ice hockey tournament held in Tampere, Finland. It is hosted by two local teams, Tappara and Ilves.

The most successful team is one of the hosts, Tappara with four titles. Metallurg Magnitogorsk has won the tournament three times and Djurgården, Dynamo Moscow, Espoo Blues and HIFK two times each.

The tournament was not played from 2009 to 2014, but it returned in 2015. The modern editions have featured four teams per year, all Finnish. Teams play semifinal matches on Friday and the winners play for the championship on Saturday while the losers play for the bronze medals. Earlier editions had more teams most of which were foreign.

Winners

External links
History of Tampere Cup

International ice hockey competitions hosted by Finland
Sport in Tampere
Ice hockey tournaments in Europe